The Saint Ildephonse of Seville Parish Church is a Roman Catholic church in Malasiqui, Pangasinan in the Philippines. It was formerly a chapel under the parish of San Carlos. Father Juan Camacho was appointed first kura paroko and founded the parish in 1665. The 1660 Revolt caused the transfer from San Carlos to its present site at the town of Malasiqui in 1661–1662. The church celebrates its feast every January 23.

History

Earlier churches
Father Luis Delfin laid down the foundation of the church in 1746, however, the church and convent were burned in 1763. The construction of a brick church began during the incumbency of Father Salvador Tapias in 1773 and it was finished in 1780. However, the church and convent was again caught by fire on February 29, 1820. Both structures underwent repair works 3 years after. Father Francisco Treserra finished the building of the tower in 1863 and in 1864 he remodeled the sanctuary and the altars. In 1878, the church and the convent were again burned. A new convent was constructed and finished in 1880. An earthquake in the same year occurred which caused the walls of the church to crack. Consequently, Father Jose Ma. Vitrian built a temporary chapel in 1882. Construction of a new church was done by Father Juan Cardaba which was completed before 1885. Another earthquake again destroyed the church on March 16, 1892.

Present church
Father Salvador Millan built the present church which was finished in 1897. However, another earthquake destroyed the church on July 16, 1990, under Father Abraham R. Esquig. The convent was converted into a Catholic School, with the blessing of Msgr. Mariano Madriaga on July 2, 1972. The reconstruction of the damaged church was planned and executed by Architects Angel B. Abad, Roman A. Macaraeg and Alvin M. Torio during the term of Father Abraham R. Esquig. It was blessed on September 28, 2002.

Architectural features
It has a baroque pediment of undulating lines in concave and convexes. The plain facade is broken by pointed plaster reliefs, flanking the windows of the upper level and the super-positioned columns flanked by pilasters.

References

External links

Roman Catholic churches in Pangasinan
1746 establishments in the Spanish Empire
Churches in the Roman Catholic Archdiocese of Lingayen–Dagupan